The Freddie Mercury Album is a posthumous solo project with material from Queen frontman and vocalist Freddie Mercury released in 1992, to observe the anniversary of his death. The album is mainly made up of new remixes, as well as the original versions of "Barcelona," "Love Kills," "Exercises in Free Love," and "The Great Pretender." A week later, The Great Pretender, its US counterpart, was released.

There were numerous producers who had permission from Jim Beach to use the original master tapes. Reinhold Mack, who is not credited as being involved, was hired to oversee the project. The album was released by Hollywood Records on 24 November 1992. 
The US album differs from its UK counterpart (aside from a different running order) by replacing the original versions of "The Great Pretender" and "Love Kills" with remixes, featuring a slightly altered ending of the "Mr. Bad Guy" remix, and replacing "Barcelona" with a remix of "My Love Is Dangerous."

Track listing

The Freddie Mercury Album
 "The Great Pretender" (Ram) – 3:25
 "Foolin' Around (Steve Brown Mix)" (Mercury) – 3:36
 "Time (Nile Rodgers Mix)" (Clark/Christie) – 3:50
 "Your Kind of Lover (Steve Brown Mix)" (Mercury) – 3:59
 "Exercises in Free Love" (Mercury/Moran) – 3:58
 "In My Defence (Ron Nevison Mix)" (Clark/Daniels/Soames) – 3:52
 "Mr. Bad Guy (Brian Malouf Mix)" (Mercury) – 3:56 
 "Let's Turn It On (Jeff Lord-Alge Mix)" (Mercury) – 3:46
 "Living on My Own (Julian Raymond Mix)" (Mercury) – 3:36  
 "Love Kills" (Mercury/Moroder) – 4:29
 "Barcelona" (Mercury/Moran) – 5:37

The Great Pretender
 "The Great Pretender (Brian Malouf Mix)" (Ram) - 3:39
 "Foolin' Around (Steve Brown Mix)" (Mercury) - 3:36
 "Time (Nile Rodgers Mix)" (Clark/Christie) - 3:50
 "Your Kind of Lover (Steve Brown Mix)" (Mercury) - 3:59
 "Exercises in Free Love" (Mercury/Moran) - 3:58
 "In My Defence (Ron Nevison Mix)" (Clark/Daniels/Soames) - 3:52
 "Mr. Bad Guy (Brian Malouf Mix)" (Mercury) - 4:01
 "Let's Turn It On (Jeff Lord-Alge Mix)" (Mercury) - 3:46
 "Living on My Own (Julian Raymond Mix)" (Mercury) - 3:37 (some pressings feature the No More Brothers Radio Mix instead)
 "My Love Is Dangerous (Jeff Lord-Alge Mix)" (Mercury) - 3:43
 "Love Kills (Richard Wolf Mix)" (Mercury/Moroder) - 3:25
 "Living on My Own (Techno Remix)" (Mercury) - 3:47 (available only on North American pressings)

Charts

Weekly charts

Year-end charts

Certifications

References

Freddie Mercury albums
1992 compilation albums
Compilation albums published posthumously
Parlophone compilation albums
Hollywood Records compilation albums